Kato Olympos is a municipal unit in the Tempi municipality, within the regional unit of Larissa, in the historical and administrative region of Thessaly, Greece. Kato Olympos has, as of 2011, a Population 3,496 inhabitants. The seat of the municipal unit is located in Pyrgetos, the largest of its four 'Local Communities':

Pyrgetos (population 1,463)
 Aigani (population 1,134)
 Rapsani (population 687)
 Krania  (population 212)

Kato Olympos contains on the southernmost faces of the foothills of Mt. Olympos and most of the Pineios river delta where the river enters the Thermaikos Gulf. The municipal unit also contains the northern half of the Vale of Tempi a narrow gorge formed by the Pineios which was the site of an important battle during the Second World War.

Notes

References

Populated places in Larissa (regional unit)